Rom (German for Rome) is the second album released by German disco group Dschinghis Khan. It features the singles "Hadschi Halef Omar", "Rom", and "Machu Picchu". The album was also released as Viva, minus four tracks. It was the last studio album with Steve Bender, who left the group in 1981.

Track listing

Rom

Viva

Charts

Weekly charts

Year-end charts

References

External links
 
 
 
 

1980 albums
Dschinghis Khan albums
German-language albums